Ensifer fredii is a nitrogen fixing bacteria of the genus Sinorhizobium. It is a fast-growing root nodule bacteria. Sinorhizobium fredii exhibit a broad host-range and are able to nodulate both determinant hosts such as soy as well as indeterminate hosts including the pigeon pea. Because of their ease of host infection there is interest in their genetics and the symbiotic role in host infection and nodule formation.

History

This species was first isolated from soybeans. The type strain was isolated from a root nodule of Glycine max growing in Hunan Province, China, designated strain USDA 205 (= ATCC 35423 = PRC 205).

References

Further reading

Bacteria described in 1994
Rhizobiaceae
Model organisms